"Boogie Child" is the third hit single from the Bee Gees' 1976 platinum album Children of the World, released in the US in early 1977. The song peaked at no. 12 on the Billboard Hot 100 as an A-side and was then used as the B-side of the single "Children of the World" in the UK. It was the last song recorded by the Bee Gees for their album Children of the World.

Content
"Boogie Child" perhaps evolved from the unreleased "Boogie Summer" (recorded on 2 April). It was one of the two songs, alongside "Can't Keep a Good Man Down", that was the last new tracks recorded for the album. "Boogie Child" was released as a single at the start of 1977 with "Lovers" as the B-side. In the UK, RSO Records issued "Children of the World" as the third single from the album with "Boogie Child" as the B-side. In New Zealand, "Children of the World" was chosen as the B-side of this single.

In December 1976, before the release of the single, the Bee Gees performed it at their concert at The Forum, Los Angeles which appears on their first concert album Here at Last... Bee Gees... Live released in May 1977. The original audio of "Boogie Child" on that concert, which features uncredited background vocalists, was replaced by Barry's background vocals when it was mixed in April 1977 in France.

Reception
Billboard described "Boogie Child" as the Bee Gees' "funkiest single to date." Cash Box said it has "a Sly-influenced lead vocal, incredibly crisp instrumentation and several emotive choruses." Record World said that "The Ohio Players-type groove should go across the board."

Personnel
Barry Gibb – lead and backing vocals, acoustic guitar
Maurice Gibb – bass, backing vocals
Robin Gibb – backing vocals
Alan Kendall – electric guitar
Dennis Bryon – drums
Blue Weaver – synthesizer, piano
Peter Graves – horn
Whit Sidener – horn
Kenny Faulk – horn
Neil Bonsanti – horn
Bill Purse – horn

Chart history

References

1976 songs
1977 singles
Bee Gees songs
British disco songs
RSO Records singles
Song recordings produced by Albhy Galuten
Song recordings produced by Barry Gibb
Song recordings produced by Maurice Gibb
Song recordings produced by Robin Gibb
Songs written by Barry Gibb
Songs written by Maurice Gibb
Songs written by Robin Gibb